Dźwierzno may refer to the following places:
Dźwierzno, Kuyavian-Pomeranian Voivodeship (north-central Poland)
Dźwierzno, Płock County in Masovian Voivodeship (east-central Poland)
Dźwierzno, Żuromin County in Masovian Voivodeship (east-central Poland)
Dźwierzno, Człuchów County in Pomeranian Voivodeship (north Poland)